Pedro Guia Lucas (16 October 2000) is a Portuguese rugby union player. He plays scrum half for Lusitanos XV and Portugal Rugby at international level.

Club career 
Lucas has played for C. R. Técnico since 2018, making his debut for the first team at 17 years of age. At 21 he plays for Portuguese franchise Lusitanos XV.

International career 
Having represented Portugal at U18 and U20 level, Lucas made his debut for Portugal Rugby in 2020 against Romania and currently has 10 caps.

References 

2000 births
Living people
Portuguese rugby union players
Rugby union scrum-halves
Portugal international rugby union players
Lusitanos XV players